Liu Peiqi (born 30 November 1957) is a Chinese actor. He started his training in 1979 when he joined Military Art School. He joined Military Drama Group in Xinjiang Province in 1983. In 1985 he starred in his first movie, Father and Son, directed by Wang Bingling. After transferring to Beijing Military Drama Group, then the China National Drama Group, Liu starred in Days Without Leifeng, directed by Lei Xianhe. For his performance, he was awarded the Golden Rooster for Best Actor (China's version of the Academy Award). He was also awarded Best Performance in a Male Leading Role in the Outstanding Film Awards organized by the Chinese Ministry of Radio, Film and Television.
Liu's recent credits include starring roles in Zhang Yimou's The Story of Qiu Ju, Zhou Xiaowen's Ermo and Chen Kaige's Together, for which he was awarded the San Sebastián International Film Festival Award for Best Actor, becoming the first Chinese actor ever to receive that award.

Filmography

Films

Television

References

External links

Male actors from Beijing
Living people
1958 births
Chinese male stage actors
20th-century Chinese male actors
21st-century Chinese male actors
Chinese male film actors
Chinese male television actors